Ceuta Heliport  is the heliport, and only air transport facility, serving the Spanish autonomous city of Ceuta, in North Africa.

Overview
Since 9 January 2004, it has been possible to fly between Ceuta and Málaga by helicopter. This heliport is the first in Spain to be constructed and managed by AENA in order to secure accessibility to the autonomous city by air. A rapid connection with the mainland is considered vital for the development of the Ceutan economy.

The heliport is situated in the port of Ceuta, between the cargo dock and the fishing port, on land reclaimed from the sea in the north of the city. The heliport consists of three helipads, a short runway, a two-storey terminal building, a power station and a fire station.

This infrastructure is key to Ceuta because it allowed passengers to connect in minutes through Málaga (mainland Spain's fourth airport by number of passengers), giving Ceuta access to all cities served from Málaga. Destinations include more than one hundred cities in Europe (mainly in the United Kingdom, Central Europe and the Nordic countries, but also the main cities of Eastern Europe: Budapest, Sofia, Warsaw, Riga and Bucharest), North Africa, the Middle East (Riyadh, Jeddah and Kuwait) and North America (New York City, Montreal).

The former ICAO code of Ceuta was GECT. It was changed in mid-2009.

Routes and services
The route was covered by Helicópteros del Sureste, a transport company based in Mutxamel, Alicante. The regular service operated since 1996, linking the city of Ceuta with Málaga Airport in thirty minutes. This route serves more than 20,000 annually, in approximately 2,600 flights. The helicopters used were the most recent versions of the AW139 which have a capacity of up to 15 passengers. It is due to become the main destination for helicopters leaving Algeciras Heliport.

Airlines and destinations

Statistics
In its second year of operation, the heliport served 20,233 passengers, handled 2,656 operations and 4.6 tonnes of cargo.

See also
 Melilla Airport - the only airport in Spanish territory on the African coast
 Sania Ramel Airport - the closest airport to Ceuta

References

External links

 Official website

Airports in Andalusia
Heliports in Spain
Buildings and structures in Ceuta
Airports established in 2004
2004 establishments in Spain